Izumi Kyōka Prize for Literature (Izumi Kyōka Bungaku Shō) is a prize for literature in Japan named for Kyōka Izumi. It was established and started in 1973 to commemorate the 100th year since the birth of Kyōka Izumi. Kanazawa city, where Izumi was born, organizes this prize. Usually the award goes to one recipient, though there have been exceptions.

List of Prize-winning works 

The City of Kanazawa, Japan maintains a list of current and past winning works.

First to 10th

11th to 20th

21st to 30th

31st to 40th

41st to 50th

51st to 60th

See also 
 List of literary awards

References 

 Official page: Izumi Kyōka Bungaku-shō

1973 establishments in Japan
Japanese literary awards
Kanazawa
Awards established in 1973